Moorhead is a city in and county seat of Clay County, Minnesota, United States, on the banks of the Red River of the North. Located in the Red River Valley, an extremely fertile and active agricultural region, Moorhead is also home to several corporations and manufacturing industries. Across the river from Fargo, North Dakota, Moorhead helps form the core of the Fargo–Moorhead ND-MN Metropolitan Area. The population was 44,505 according to the 2020 census. 

Platted in 1871, the city was named for William Galloway Moorhead, an official of the Northern Pacific Railway.

History

The city was platted in 1871 and named for William Galloway Moorhead, a Northern Pacific Railway official and brother-in-law of financier Jay Cooke.

The former Moorhead Armory on 5th Street South was the site of the intended concert destination for musicians Buddy Holly, Ritchie Valens, and The Big Bopper before their fatal plane crash a few miles north of Clear Lake, Iowa around 1.00 am Tuesday February 3, 1959. The building was demolished in 1990 and is now the site of Ecumen Evergreens, a senior living property.

Moorhead is home to the first Dairy Queen to sell Dilly Bars. The Moorhead Dairy Queen is also one of only a few Dairy Queens operating on a contract signed in 1949, which allows it to feature products not approved by corporate Headquarters. An example includes a chipper sandwich, vanilla ice cream sandwiched between two chocolate chip cookies and dipped in chocolate.

Geography
Moorhead is located adjacent to the Red River in the Red River Valley. The land around the Fargo–Moorhead area is some of the flattest and richest (for agricultural uses) in the world. This is because it lies on the lake bed of glacial Lake Agassiz, which drained between 9,900 and 11,000 years ago.

Climate

Demographics

According to the 2010–2012 American Community Survey, the racial composition was as follows:
 White: 90.4% (Non-Hispanic Whites: 88.0%)
 Black or African American: 2.1%
 American Indian: 1.3%
 Asian: 1.5%
 Pacific Islander: 0.1%
 Some other race: 1.2%
 Two or more races: 3.4%
 Hispanic or Latino (of any race): 4.3%

According to the 2006–2008 American Community Survey, the top ten European ancestries were the following:
 Norwegian: 36.1%
 German: 36.0%
 Swedish: 7.6%
 Irish: 7.2%
 English: 4.7%
 French: 3.7%
 Polish: 3.6%
 American: 2.3%
 Italian: 1.5%
 Dutch: 1.4%

2010 census
As of the census of 2010, there were 38,065 people, 14,304 households, and 8,372 families living in the city. The racial makeup of the city was 90.7% White, 2.0% African American, 1.5% Native American, 2.0% Asian, 1.1% from other races, and 2.6% from two or more races. Hispanic or Latino of any race were 4.1% of the population.

There were 14,304 households, of which 29.4% had children under the age of 18 living with them, 43.5% were married couples living together, 10.6% had a female householder with no husband present, 4.4% had a male householder with no wife present, and 41.5% were non-families. 29.2% of all households were made up of individuals, and 10% had someone living alone who was 65 years of age or older. The average household size was 2.41 and the average family size was 2.97.

The median age in the city was 28.3 years. 20.9% of residents were under the age of 18; 23.7% were between the ages of 18 and 24; 23.4% were from 25 to 44; 20.5% were from 45 to 64; and 11.5% were 65 years of age or older. The gender makeup of the city was 48.4% male and 51.6% female.

2000 census
As of the census of 2000, there were 32,177 people, 11,660 households, and 7,030 families living in the city. The racial makeup of the city was 92.08% White, 0.77% African American, 1.94% Native American, 1.27% Asian, 0.04% Pacific Islander, 2.10% from other races, and 1.79% from two or more races. Hispanic or Latino of any race were 4.47% of the population.

There were 11,660 households, out of which 31.4% had children under the age of 18 living with them, 47.3% were married couples living together, 9.8% had a female householder with no husband present, and 39.7% were non-families. 29.2% of all households were made up of individuals, and 11.1% had someone living alone who was 65 years of age or older. The average household size was 2.43 and the average family size was 3.04.

In the city, the population was spread out, with 22.7% under the age of 18, 23.1% from 18 to 24, 24.2% from 25 to 44, 17.2% from 45 to 64, and 12.8% who were 65 years of age or older. The median age was 29 years. For every 100 females, there were 88.4 males. For every 100 females age 18 and over, there were 83.3 males.

The median income for a household in the city was $34,781, and the median income for a family was $49,118. Males had a median income of $33,137 versus $23,717 for females. The per capita income for the city was $17,150. About 8.2% of families and 16.3% of the population were below the poverty line, including 14.9% of those under age 18 and 6.4% of those age 65 or over.

Politics

Transportation
Moorhead has multiple transportation options available to residents with intercity buses, trains and air travel available in Fargo. Locally, the city is served with public transit by MATBUS.
Interstate 94 and U.S. Highways 10, 52 (concurrent with I-94), and 75 are four of the main roadways in the city. Other nearby routes in the Fargo–Moorhead area include Interstate 29 and Minnesota State Highway 336.

Economy
Agriculture remains prominent in the area, but Moorhead is also home to notable corporate, manufacturing and distribution industries, including American Crystal Sugar (corporate headquarters and sugar beet processing), Busch Agricultural Resources (malt manufacturing) and Pactiv (container manufacturing). The unemployment rate is consistently below the national average and property values are stable.

Principal employers
According to the City's 2019 Comprehensive Annual Financial Report, the largest employers in the city are:

Arts and culture
The Rourke Art Gallery and the Rourke Art Museum are native Moorhead cultural institutions hosting the annual Midwestern Invitational Exhibition. The museum displays an important art collection from local, regional and national artists. The Rourke Museum is housed in the historic Moorhead Post Office building.

The city is also home to the Bluestem Center for the Arts, a 3,000 seat outdoor amphitheater that opened in 2009 with a partnership between the Fargo Public Schools, the City of Moorhead, and an arts grant from the state of Minnesota.   Bluestem hosts a summer concert series which has drawn many famous bands including Wilco, Goo Goo Dolls, The Beach Boys, and Weezer.

The Bluestem Center for the Arts is home to Trollwood Performing Arts School, a renowned summer arts and theater program for students of all ages.

The Comstock House is a historic house museum, a blend of Queen Anne and Eastlake styles built in 1883. Solomon Comstock was a lawyer and U.S. House Representative.

Hjemkomst Center

The Hjemkomst Center is a local museum containing a full-scale replica of a Viking ship of the same name. The Hjemkomst vessel was built in nearby Hawley by Moorhead resident Robert Asp, and was sailed from Duluth to Oslo, Norway in 1982 by his children following Asp's death. The ship is now permanently housed in the center.

The Clay County Museum and Archives, operated by the Clay County Historical Society, interprets the history of Clay County in a free museum in the lower level of the Hjemkomst Center. The Society has more than 30,000 artifacts in their collection, one of the largest and most important historic collections in Minnesota outside of the Minneapolis-St. Paul area.

Located on the grounds of the Hjemkomst Center is a Stave Church. The traditional Norwegian-style church serves as a symbol of the Norwegian heritage in the Red River Valley. The church is a full-scale replica of the Hopperstad stave church in Vik, Norway.

Sports
The Fargo-Moorhead RedHawks is an independent professional baseball team that plays at Newman Outdoor Field in Fargo. They are part of the American Association.

Being a cold weather city, hockey has emerged as a favorite sport of Moorhead. The community has provided significant support to hockey programs such as Moorhead Youth Hockey. Over the years, Moorhead Senior High has produced a number of talented hockey players, including:
 Jason Blake (MHS '92) Most recently played for the Anaheim Ducks, formerly of the Toronto Maple Leafs and New York Islanders. He played at the 2006 Olympic games for the United States in Turin, Italy. He was named an NHL all-star during the 2006–07 season and was awarded the Bill Masterton Memorial Trophy in 2007–2008 for being the "player who best exemplifies the qualities of perseverance, sportsmanship, and dedication to ice hockey."
 Ryan Kraft (MHS '94) Played for the San Jose Sharks. He also played for the EC Kassel Huskies in Germany, including contributing to their 2007–2008 Bundesliga championship. Prior to that, he played in the AHL, IHL, and ECHL. He also represented Team USA at the 2001 IIHF World Championship.
 Matt Cullen (MHS '95) Currently playing for the Pittsburgh Penguins. He was a member of the 2005–2006 Carolina Hurricanes who won the NHL Stanley Cup (championship) in 2006. He also played at the 2006 Olympic games for the United States in Turin, Italy.
 Mark Cullen (MHS '97) Currently a professional hockey player in Europe. Most recently played in the NHL for the Florida Panthers. Originally signed to the Minnesota Wild in 2002 after a collegiate career at Colorado College, he has played for several AHL teams throughout his career, as well as for the Chicago Blackhawks and Philadelphia Flyers. He also represented Team USA at the 2006 IIHF World Championship.
 Brian Lee (MHS '05) Most recently played for the Tampa Bay Lightning. Previously played for the University of North Dakota and the U.S. National Junior Team. Also played for the Ottawa Senators.
 Chris VandeVelde (MHS '05) Currently playing for the Philadelphia Flyers. Previously played for the Oklahoma City Barons (AHL), the University of North Dakota (winners of the 2010 WCHA Final Five tournament), and the Lincoln Stars (USHL).

Olympic pairs figure skater Mark Ladwig also hails from Moorhead. With partner Amanda Evora, he was a two-time U.S. national silver medalist and competed in the 2010 Winter Olympics. With Lindsay Davis, he was part of the 2012–2013 U.S. Figure Skating Reserve Team.

Education

The city has four institutions of higher learning: Concordia College (private Christian liberal arts college), Minnesota State University Moorhead (public university), Minnesota State Community and Technical College (two-year to four-year technical college), and Rasmussen College (a two- to four-year college). The combined student enrollment of these colleges is approximately 14,000.

K-12 education is provided to over 5,000 students by the Moorhead School District: S.G. Reinertsen Elementary, Robert Asp Elementary, Ellen Hopkins Elementary, Dorothy Dodds Elementary, Horizon Middle School and Moorhead High School. The district is known for its high student achievement with students consistently performing above the national average on the ACT. The district includes the cities of Moorhead, Georgetown, Kragnes, and Sabin.

The city includes the Red River Area Learning Center and the Probstfield Center for Education.

Park Christian School is a private Christian school in Moorhead providing a K–12 education as well as St. Joseph's, a Catholic elementary school.

The Moorhead Public Library (1906) at 102 6th Street South was paid for by Andrew Carnegie and designed by architect Milton Earl Beebe.

Media

 The Forum of Fargo-Moorhead, regional newspaper printed in Fargo
 High Plains Reader, news weekly
 Minnesota Public Radio, Concordia College hosts an MPR bureau
 Moorhead Community Access Media, local access cable TV programming on channels 12 and 99
 NDSU Spectrum
 MSUM Advocate
 The Extra, Legal newspaper of record for the City of Moorhead

Notable people
 Jason Blake – NHL player
 Will Borgen – NHL defenceman for the Seattle Kraken
 Joel D. Carlson - Minnesota state legislator and businessman
 Rene Clausen – (b. 1953) American composer and conductor of The Concordia Choir
 Ada Comstock – (1876–1973) Master's degree, Columbia University 1899, first full-time president of Radcliffe College. 
 Matt Cullen – NHL player
 William B. Dosland - (1927-1993), Minnesota state senator and lawyer
 Wallace B. Douglas - (1852–1930), Minnesota jurist, lawyer, and politician
 Becky Gulsvig – (b. 1982) actress
 Loren D. Hagen – (1946–1971) US Army Special Forces Green Beret and Medal of Honor recipient
 Kenneth J. Kludt - Minnesota state legislator and lawyer
 Ryan Kraft – NHL player
 Mark Ladwig – (b. 1980) figure skater
 Brian Lee – NHL player
 Warren G. Magnuson – (1905–1989) former U.S. Senator of Washington
 Thomas McGrath – (1916–1990) poet, screenwriter, Rhodes scholar, English professor
 Adolph Murie – (1899–1974) biologist, author, ecologist
 Olaus Murie – (1889–1963) biologist, author, ecologist.  Half-brother of Adolph, and member of Murie family
 Wally O'Neill – NFL player
 Collin Peterson, Democratic U.S. Representative for Minnesota's 7th congressional district (attended college in Moorhead)
 Leslie Stefanson – actress
 Karl Truesdell, U.S. Army major general
 Merlyn Orville Valan (1926-2010) - Minnesota state legislator and farmer
 Chris VandeVelde – NHL player
 Diane Wray Williams - Minnesota state legislator, businesswoman, and teacher
 Roy Williams  – NFL player
 Sister Annella Zervas, O.S.B., (1900–1926) nun of Saint Benedict's Monastery and the closest that Minnesota possesses to a Canonized Saint. Her current title is Servant of God.

In popular culture
Moorhead is briefly referenced in the 1998 Coen brothers' film The Big Lebowski as the hometown of one of the main characters, Bunny Lebowski, played by Tara Reid. The high school photo of Bunny shown in the movie even has her wearing the correct orange, black, and white school colors of the Moorhead Spuds.

Moorhead is also mentioned in the 1978 film The Buddy Holly Story as the next stop in the ill-fated Winter Dance Party tour. Buddy Holly, Ritchie Valens and The Big Bopper died in a plane crash en route to their scheduled performance at the Moorhead Armory Building from Clear Lake, Iowa on February 3, 1959.

Moorhead's pioneer Prairie Home Cemetery on 8th Street was the inspiration for the name of Garrison Keillor's national radio program, A Prairie Home Companion. Although Keillor thought the cemetery was founded by Norwegian Lutherans, in fact it was organized in 1875 by the Rev. Oscar Elmer, a Yankee Presbyterian minister who was the first ordained Christian minister in the Moorhead/Fargo area.

In the movie The Straight Story, Alvin Straight (Richard Farnsworth) mentions that he and his brother, Lyle Straight, were born and raised in Moorhead.

See also
 Fairmont Creamery - a historic building now used as a retirement home.
 Fargo-Moorhead Toll Bridge
 Northern Lights Library Network

References

External links

 
 

 
Cities in Minnesota
Cities in Clay County, Minnesota
Fargo–Moorhead
County seats in Minnesota
1871 establishments in Minnesota
Populated places established in 1871